Miss Bangladesh US (Formerly known as Miss Bangladesh USA) is a Beauty pageant in United States for Bangladeshi Americans. It is the national pageant that elects the Bangladesh representative to Miss Asia Pacific International and Miss Earth. Miss Bangladesh USA is emerged as the first pageant for Bangladeshi women in almost two decades and is the first organization to be sending a Bangladeshi representative to Miss Asia Pacific International and Miss Earth. The current titleholder for Miss Bangladesh US is MJ Chowdhury of New York.

History 
The Miss Bangladesh USA Contest was first organized in 2015 and was held on a social media platform via Facebook. The organization was founded by Hiam Amani Hafizuddin who herself competed in various pageants including local preliminaries in the Miss Illinois regions of the Miss America organization and was a 2016 National Finalist for Miss World America. Seeing that there had been no pageants present for Bangladeshi women, Hafizuddin created the Miss Bangladesh USA pageant to provide Bangladeshi American women with a platform to inspire social change, promote education, showcase talents, and celebrate Bangladeshi heritage and culture. In the first year, women were evaluated on their resume, social platform, and ability to engage people on multimedia outlets. The first ever Miss Bangladesh USA became Sumaira Ahmed of Boston with the platform of raising awareness for Neuromyelitis optica, an autoimmune disease that she had been diagnosed with.

In the second installment of Miss Bangladesh USA, the pageant evolved into a live stage show. Miss Bangladesh USA 2016 was held at Northeastern Illinois University on August 6, 2016. Eight contestants from across the United States competed in private interview, platform speech, cultural wear, talent, evening sari and on stage question. Miss Bangladesh USA 2016 was held as a two division pageant, featuring Miss Bangladesh USA Teen for the first time.

Prior to the competition, the Miss Bangladesh USA organization joined in franchise with Asia's largest and oldest beauty pageant, the Miss Asia Pacific International pageant. It was decided that the winner of Miss Bangladesh USA would represent Bangladesh at Miss Asia Pacific International for the first time. This would also be the first time in over a decade that Bangladesh would be represented at an international Beauty pageant.

In 2016, a contestant of the Miss Bangladesh US pageant, Lamiya Haque, became the first candidate to represent Bangladesh at the 2016 Miss Asia Pacific International pageant. 

The 2016 winner of Miss Bangladesh USA, MJ Chowdhury, represented Bangladesh at the 2018 Miss Asia Pacific International competition and became the first Bangladeshi woman to place in the top 20 of an international beauty pageant. 

As of 2020, the Miss Bangladesh US pageant has been put on hold.

Miss Bangladesh USA Winners 
 2015: Sumaira Ahmed 
 2016: MJ Chowdhury

Miss Bangladesh USA Teen Winners 
 2016: Ani Barua 

Beauty pageants in the United States
Miss Grand International by country